The Battle of Yanbu or Yanbu Landing, was a bloodless confrontation between the Saudis and Ottomans in 1811. The Ottoman Sultan ordered Mohammed Ali Pasha to start moving against Saudis to re-conquer Mecca and return the honour of the Ottoman Empire. Mohammed Ali sent his son Tusun Pasha with an army of 10,000 as a beginning to land in Yanbu, rendering it a station to re-conquer the other cities.

Tusun's forces landed successfully in Yanbu and the Saudi forces, with a strength of just 70 men, surrendered without any losses.

References 

Battles of the Wahhabi War
Battle
Battles involving the Ottoman Empire
Ottoman Arabia
First Saudi State
Battles involving Saudi Arabia
Conflicts in 1811
1811 in Asia
Battles and conflicts without fatalities